Miss India Worldwide 2010 was the 19th edition of the international beauty pageant. The final was held in Durban, South Africa on  March 27, 2010. About 24 countries were represented in the pageant. Kajal Lutchminarain of South Africa was crowned as the winner at the end of the event.

Notable participants in this pageant 
 Priyanka Singha, American actress and activist
 Ruhi Chaturvedi, Indian television actress
 Niharica Raizada, Luxembourgish film actress
 Pallavi Sharda, Australian film and television actress
 Amin Dhillon, Canadian television host and media personality

Results

Special awards

Delegate

 – Pallavi Sharda
 – Sohum Bhatt
 – Amin Dhillon
 – Lucria Rambalak
 – Ruhi Chaturvedi
 – Namrata Udani
 – Rucha Gawas
 – Akanksha Nehra
 – Neelaveni Kathirtchelvan
 – Not Known
 – Vatsala Sharma
 – Vandana Biere
 – Jumana Shakeer
 – Not Known
 – Kajal Lutchminarain 
 – Cher Merchand
 – Richa Adhia
 – Not Known
 – Aparna Sharma
 – Niharica Raizada
 – Priyanka Singha

References

External links
http://www.worldwidepageants.com/

2010 beauty pageants